Being Out Rocks is a compilation album released October 11, 2002 by the Human Rights Campaign, in collaboration with Centaur Entertainment. Its release coincided with  National Coming Out Day; "Being Out Rocks" was also that year's theme.

The album features a cross-section of LGBT and gay-supportive straight artists. The release was accompanied with signing events at the Times Square Virgin Megastore in New York City and at the HRC Action Center & Store in Washington, D.C.

Track listing 

 Sarah McLachlan – "Angel" (5:32)
 k.d. lang – "Summerfling" (3:49)
 Cyndi Lauper – "Shine" (3:46)
 Rufus Wainwright – "California" (3:20)
 Ani DiFranco – "In or Out" (3:06)
 Janis Ian – "Society's Child" (3:39)
 Sam Harris – "First Time Ever I Saw Your Face" (4:22)
 SONiA – Me, Too (4:52)
 Suede – "Remember Who You Are" (3:24)
 Catie Curtis – "Kiss That Counted" (3:24)
 The B-52's – "Topaz" (4:22)
 Bob Mould – "Soundonsound" (4:08)
 Queen – "Is This the World We Created?" (2:36)
 Cris Williamson – "Driving Wheel" (3:22)
 Dar Williams – "Are You Out There?" (3:04)
 Matt Zarley – "Say Goodbye" (4:13)
 The Butchies – "IHate.com" (2:22)
 Jade Esteban Estrada – "Bella Morena" (4:37)
 Taylor Dayne – "How Many" (4:09)
 Kevin Aviance – "Alive" (3:49)
 Harvey Fierstein – "I Am What I Am" (2:20)

External links 
 HRC Press Release

2002 compilation albums